Lieutenant-General Sir Richard Downes Jackson KCB (1777 – 9 June 1845), born at Petersfield in the English county of Hampshire, was an officer in the British Army and subsequently colonial Administrator. Following service during the Napoleonic Wars, he was appointed the Commander-in-Chief of the British Army in British North America. During that time, he also served for a few months as the Administrator of the government of the Province of Canada.  He died in Canada in 1845 and is buried there.

Military career
Jackson was commissioned as an ensign in the Coldstream Guards on 9 July 1794. After seeing action during the Irish Rebellion of 1798 he took part in the Battle of Copenhagen during the Napoleonic Wars. He fought at the Siege of Cádiz and the Battle of Barrosa during the Peninsular War and was knighted on 12 April 1815.

After the conclusion of the Napoleonic Wars, Jackson was appointed deputy quartermaster general in 1820, General Officer Commanding Northern District in 1836 and Commander-in-Chief, North America in 1839, a post which he held until his death in 1845.

Administrator of Province of Canada

In September 1841, Lord Sydenham, the Governor General of the Province of Canada, died in office. Jackson was appointed the Administrator of the Province. He exercised the powers of the Governor General until the arrival of Sydenham's successor, Sir Charles Bagot in early 1842.

Death 

Jackson continued as Commander-in-Chief until 1845 when, missing his family in England, he asked to be recalled. Instead, he died suddenly in the summer of 1845, shortly before the arrival of his successor, Lord Cathcart.  He was buried near his country home at William-Henry, Canada East (now Sorel, Quebec).

References

 

|-

|-

|-

|-

1777 births
1845 deaths
Governors-General of the Province of Canada
People from Petersfield
British Army lieutenant generals
People of the Irish Rebellion of 1798
British Army personnel of the French Revolutionary Wars
British Army personnel of the Napoleonic Wars
Knights Commander of the Order of the Bath
Coldstream Guards officers
Military personnel from Hampshire